The 2003 ATS Formel 3 Cup was a multi-event motor racing championship for single-seat open wheel formula racing cars that held across Europe. The championship featured drivers competing in two-litre Formula Three racing cars built by Dallara which conform to the technical regulations, or formula, for the championship. It was the inaugural edition of the ATS F3 Cup. It commenced on 3 May at Oschersleben and ended at the same place on 12 October after eight double-header rounds.

JB Motorsport driver João Paulo de Oliveira became the first and only Brazilian champion. He dominated the season, winning all but three races. Sven Barth won Rookie title and one of the races to finish the season as runner-up with 138-point gap to de Oliveira. The third place went to Hannes Neuhauser, who won both races of the opening round.

Teams and drivers
All drivers competed in Dallara chassis; model listed.

Race calendar and results
With the exception of two rounds at A1-Ring in Austria, all rounds took place on German soil.

Championship standings

Cup
Points were awarded as follows:

† — Drivers did not finish the race, but were classified as they completed over 90% of the race distance.

Junior-Pokal (Rookie) standings

References

External links
 

German Formula Three Championship seasons
Formula Three season
German
German Formula 3 Championship